Better Than Honour (foaled February 27, 1996 in Kentucky) is an American thoroughbred mare racehorse, best known for her career as a broodmare.  She is out of the Kentucky Oaks winner, Blush With Pride, by the sire, Deputy Minister. Owned by Robert Waxman, she was trained by John Kimmel.

Lightly raced at two, Better Than Honour, the favorite, won the Grade II Demoiselle Stakes after Tutorial veered in down the stretch and was disqualified and placed fifth.  At three, Better Than Honour placed in the Acorn Stakes and Comely Stakes, with a show in the Mother Goose Stakes.

When her racing career was over, Better Than Honour was purchased by John G. Sikura of Hill 'n' Dale Farms in Kentucky. He sold her to Skara Glen Stables in 2001 then in 2005, while in foal to Mineshaft, she was sold at the 2004 Keeneland November sale for $2 Million to Coolmore Stud and Michael Tabor. She is now the property of John G. Sikura and Southern Equine Stables and resides at Hill 'n' Dale in Kentucky.

Better Than Honour was sold again for a world-record price for a broodmare of $14 million at the 2008 November Fasig-Tipton sale in Kentucky. Southern Equine Stables paid that amount in order to acquire one hundred percent ownership.

Better Than Honour has foaled several graded stakes winners, including:
 Jazil (b. 2003) - winner of the 2006 Belmont Stakes
 Rags To Riches (b. 2004) - winner of the 2007 Kentucky Oaks and Belmont Stakes
 Casino Drive (b. 2005) - winner of the 2008 Peter Pan Stakes
 Man of Iron (b. 2006) - winner of the 2009 Breeders' Cup Marathon

Resources
 Better Than Honour's pedigree and racing stats

External links
 Two dams looking to land classic double
 11/28/98 Aqueduct

1996 racehorse births
Racehorses bred in Kentucky
Racehorses trained in the United States
Kentucky Broodmare of the Year
Thoroughbred family 8-f